The 2016 Miami Dolphins season was the franchise's 47th season in the National Football League, the 51st overall and the first under head coach Adam Gase. The season saw the Dolphins trying to improve upon their 6–10 record from 2015. After a lackluster 1–4 start, the Dolphins would claim six straight wins, and finish the season on a 9–2 run. With their Week 15 win over the New York Jets, the Dolphins clinched a winning record for the first time since 2008, and clinched a playoff berth the following week after the Kansas City Chiefs defeated the Denver Broncos, ending their 8-year playoff drought. This made Gase the Dolphins' first rookie coach since Tony Sparano to end a year-long playoff drought and also lead them to a winning record of at least 10 wins. They were also the first AFC East team, other than the New England Patriots, to qualify for the postseason since the 2010 New York Jets. However, they were defeated by the Pittsburgh Steelers in the Wild Card round, ending their season and not winning a playoff game for the 16th straight year. 

This was the last season that the Dolphins beat the Bills until the 2022 season.

Offseason

Organizational changes
On January 2, 2016, two-year general manager Dennis Hickey was fired. On January 4, the Dolphins promoted director of college scouting Chris Grier to replace Hickey as the new general manager. Grier has been with the Dolphins for the past sixteen seasons, nine as the director of scouting.
 
The Dolphins front office, which is made up of owner Stephen Ross, executive vice president of football operations Mike Tannenbaum, CEO Tom Garfinkel, vice chairman Matt Higgins and Grier, developed a committee to find a permanent replacement for former head coach Joe Philbin, who was fired and replaced by tight ends coach Dan Campbell on October 5, 2015.

The Dolphins conducted interviews with seven candidates. The candidates included former Atlanta Falcons head coach Mike Smith, former Washington Redskins and Denver Broncos head coach Mike Shanahan, former Buffalo Bills head coach Doug Marrone, Bills assistant head coach Anthony Lynn, Chicago Bears offensive coordinator Adam Gase, Detroit Lions defensive coordinator Teryl Austin and interim head coach Campbell. The Dolphins requested interviews with New England Patriots offensive coordinator Josh McDaniels and defensive coordinator Matt Patricia, as well as Cincinnati Bengals offensive coordinator Hue Jackson.

Owner Ross expressed interest in New Orleans Saints head coach Sean Payton; however, on January 6, Payton announced he would remain in New Orleans for another season.

On January 9, Gase was hired as the twelfth head coach in Dolphins history. He was the only candidate to receive a second interview. On January 12, Gase hired Bengals' defensive back coach Vance Joseph as defensive coordinator and linebackers coach Matt Burke, who worked with Joseph in Cincinnati, in the same position. Gase also hired Washington Redskins' offensive line assistant Shane Day as tight ends coach, San Francisco 49ers' offensive line coach Chris Foerster in the same position and former NFL wide receiver Shawn Jefferson as the wide receivers coach. Assistant general manager Eric Stokes was promoted to senior personnel executive.

On August 16, 2016, the Dolphins announced the naming rights to their home stadium had been sold to Hard Rock International. The stadium, which was known as Sun Life Stadium in 2015 and was being called "New Miami Stadium" during the $500 million renovations completed during the summer of 2016, will be known as "Hard Rock Stadium."

Roster changes
The Dolphins entered free agency with 11 unrestricted free agents.

Acquisitions
The Dolphins first addition of 2016 was the signing of wide receiver/cornerback Tyler Davis on January 4, on a futures contract. Davis became the first German Football League player to be signed by an NFL team.

March 7, 2016 – The Dolphins acquire LB Kiko Alonso and CB Byron Maxwell from the Philadelphia Eagles in exchange for swapping first round picks (8 and 13).

March 8, 2016 – The Dolphins sign DE Mario Williams on a 2-year, $16 million contract.

March 9, 2016 – The Dolphins sign S Isa Abdul-Quddus on a 3-year, $12.75 million contract.

May 13, 2016 – The Dolphins sign DE Jason Jones on a 1-year, $1.5 million contract.

Departures
The Dolphins first departure of 2016 was the waiving of offensive tackle Jason Curtis Fox, who had one year remaining on his contract, on January 12.

The Dolphins also released cornerback Brent Grimes and wide receiver Greg Jennings on March 5, 2016 after an uneventful 2015 season.

On March 9, the Dolphins lost Olivier Vernon, Lamar Miller, Derrick Shelby, Kelvin Sheppard, and Rishard Matthews to other teams during free agency.

Draft

Notes
 The team traded its first-round selection to the Philadelphia Eagles in exchange for a first-round selection, cornerback Byron Maxwell and linebacker Kiko Alonso.
The Baltimore Ravens traded its second-round selection to Miami in exchange for Miami's second and fourth-round selections.
 Miami traded its fifth-round selection to the New England Patriots in exchange for New England's 2 sixth-round selections and a seventh-round selection.
 The Dolphins acquired an additional seventh-round selection in a trade that sent cornerback Will Davis to the Baltimore Ravens.

Staff

Final roster

Schedule

Preseason
This was the first preseason since 1999 that the Dolphins did not play the Tampa Bay Buccaneers.

Regular season

Note: Intra-division opponents are in bold text.

Postseason

Game summaries

Regular season

Week 1: at Seattle Seahawks

The Dolphins opened their 2016 season at Seattle. This game would mark their first visit to Seattle since 2004. In the first quarter, the Dolphins would trail early as Steven Hauschka nailed a 39-yard field goal, giving Seattle a 3–0 lead. Miami would tie the game 3–3 on an Andrew Franks 41-yard field goal. But, the Seahawks would retake the lead on another Hauschka field goal, this time from 38 yards. After a scoreless 3rd quarter, Miami would finally take their first lead on a Ryan Tannehill 2 yard touchdown run, giving Miami a 10–6 lead with 4:08 left. However, Seattle would march down the field and take the lead for good, as Russell Wilson found Doug Baldwin from 2 yards out. With the loss, Miami started their season 0–1.

Week 2: at New England Patriots

After trailing 31–3 for most of the game, Miami made the game close, but the comeback was short, as the Patriots held on for the win. With the loss, Miami fell to 0–2 for the first time since 2011.

Week 3: vs. Cleveland Browns

Cleveland kicker Cody Parkey missed three field goals in the game, including a potential game winner with no time left on the clock. After both teams failed on their opening drive of the overtime period, Jay Ajayi capped a three-play, 44-yard drive with an 11-yard run into the end zone to give Miami the win. With that, the Dolphins improved to 1–2.

Week 4: at Cincinnati Bengals

The Dolphins wore orange Color Rush uniforms for this game. The Bengals dominated this game from start to finish, forcing two Miami turnovers. With the loss, the Dolphins fell to 1–3.

Week 5: vs. Tennessee Titans

In the first of three games at home before their bye, the Dolphins gave up an early lead to the Tennessee Titans that they failed to overturn, as they fell to 1–4. Tannehill was sacked six times in the game.

Week 6: vs. Pittsburgh Steelers

Ben Roethlisberger was injured and taken out of the game briefly after throwing two interceptions and tearing his meniscus. The Steelers led 8–3 with less than 10 minutes played in the first quarter, but the Dolphins outscored the Steelers 27–7 for the remainder of the game. With the win, the Dolphins improved to 2–4, and started a six-game winning streak.

Week 7: vs. Buffalo Bills

The Dolphins trailed 17–6 going into the final minute of the third quarter, but three consecutive touchdowns by the Dolphins gave them a 28–25 win and they improved to 3–4. Running back Jay Ajayi became the first Dolphins running back to rush for over 200 yards in consecutive games since Ricky Williams accomplished the feat in 2002.

Week 9: vs. New York Jets

The Dolphins had the lead going into the fourth quarter, only for Jalin Marshall to put the Jets ahead with less than six minutes to go; however, Kenyan Drake returned the ensuing kickoff 96 yards for a touchdown to give the Dolphins the win, and they improved to 4–4. They also defeated the Jets at home for the first time since 2011.

Week 10: at San Diego Chargers

The Dolphins would intercept Philip Rivers four times in the second half. Towards the end of the game, Kiko Alonso returned an interception 60 yards for the game-winning touchdown. With the win, the Dolphins went to 5–4.

Week 11: at Los Angeles Rams

Miami trailed 10–0 with just over four minutes remaining, but touchdown passes from quarterback Ryan Tannehill to Jarvis Landry and DeVante Parker put the Dolphins up by four points with 36 seconds left on the clock. The Rams' rookie quarterback Jared Goff attempted a hail mary pass to try and give the Rams the win, but the pass was incomplete, resulting in a 14–10 win for the Dolphins. With the win, the Dolphins improved to 6–4. They also improved to 11–2 all-time against the Rams, with 2001 being the last season the Rams defeated the Dolphins. It was also the Dolphins' first 5-game winning streak since 2008.

Week 12: vs. San Francisco 49ers

Holding a seven-point lead inside the two-minute warning, the Dolphins stopped 49ers quarterback Colin Kaepernick just short of the end zone as time expired to claim a 31–24 win and their first 6-game winning streak since 2005. With the win, the Dolphins improved to 7–4.

Week 13: at Baltimore Ravens

With the Dolphins seeking a 7-game winning streak for the first time since 1985 and the first win in Baltimore since 1997, this loss snapped the Dolphins' 6-game winning streak and they fell to 7–5. It was also Miami’s seventh loss to the Ravens in the last nine meetings.

Week 14: vs. Arizona Cardinals

On a wet day in Miami, Andrew Franks kicked the game-winning field goal as time expired to give the Dolphins a 26–23 win over the Arizona Cardinals. With the win, the Dolphins went to 8–5. The Dolphins also snapped their three-game losing streak against the Cardinals, beating them for the first time since 1999. Ryan Tannehill suffered a season-ending knee injury when he was hit low by Calais Campbell although the injury was diagnosed as a sprain and not a torn ACL as was originally feared.

Week 15: at New York Jets

With the blowout Saturday night win on the road, the Dolphins improved to 9–5, their first winning season since 2008. Matt Moore was named AFC Offensive Player of the Week for his four-touchdown performance.

Week 16: at Buffalo Bills

Miami needed a 56-yard field goal by Andrew Franks to force overtime, and the combination of a missed Dan Carpenter FG attempt by Buffalo and a 57-yard run by Jay Ajayi set Franks up to make the game-winning kick. This clinched Miami's first 10-win season since 2008, and after the Christmas Day win by Kansas City over Denver, it also led to Miami's first playoff berth in eight years.

Week 17: vs. New England Patriots

With the loss, Miami ended their season 10–6 and finished as the 6th seed in the AFC.

Postseason

AFC Wild Card Playoffs: at (3) Pittsburgh Steelers

Standings

Division

Conference

References

External links
 

Miami
Miami Dolphins seasons
Miami Dolphins